Oon Yung is a North Korean diplomat in Europe. In the 1990s he served time at the North Korean embassy in France. He was responsible for recruiting South Koreans such as Jean-Baptiste Kim to Pyongyang.

References 

North Korean diplomats
Ambassadors to France
Living people
Year of birth missing (living people)